Zarrenthiner Kiessee is a lake in the Vorpommern-Greifswald district in Mecklenburg-Vorpommern, Germany. At an elevation of 7.2 m, its surface area is 0.54 km2.

Lakes of Mecklenburg-Western Pomerania